Garaneh (also Romanized as Qārāneh; also known as Gārāneh) is a village in Margavar Rural District, Silvaneh District, Urmia County, West Azerbaijan Province, Iran. At the 2006 census, its population was 421, in 79 families. 
Name
Garana is a Kurdish name. "Ga" means Cow, "Garan" means cattle, herd. The village is named "Garana" after its construction in a place which was dedicated to cattle of nearby villages. 
Demographics:
Total population of the village speak northern Kurdish dialect (Kurmanji) and they follow Shafe'i school of sunni Islam.

References 

Populated places in Urmia County